Máximo Rolón Villa (born November 18, 1934 in Asunción, Paraguay) is a former Paraguayan footballer who has played for clubs in Paraguay, Chile and Colombia.

Teams
  Libertad 1954-1956
  Everton 1957-1959
  San Luis de Quillota 1960
  América de Cali 1961
  Santiago Wanderers 1962
  Valparaiso Ferroviarios 1962

Titles
  Libertad 1955 (Paraguayan Primera División Championship)

Honours
  Libertad 1954, 1955 and 1956 (Top Scorer Paraguayan Primera División Championship)
  Everton 1958 (Top Scorer Copa Chile)

References
 

1934 births
Living people
Paraguayan footballers
Paraguayan expatriate footballers
Paraguay international footballers
Club Libertad footballers
América de Cali footballers
San Luis de Quillota footballers
Everton de Viña del Mar footballers
Santiago Wanderers footballers
Paraguayan Primera División players
Chilean Primera División players
Categoría Primera A players
Expatriate footballers in Chile
Expatriate footballers in Colombia
Association football forwards